Famous Vietnamese fairy tales include The Hundred-knot Bamboo Tree and The Story of Tấm and Cám. Various tales have been translated into English, as well as folk tales containing some elements of fairy tales.

Well known tales
 "The Wishing Pearl" - a peasant befriends an animal and receives a magic gift 
 "The Student and the Frog" - about a frog who becomes a beautiful woman 
 Tấm Cám "The Two Sisters" - a dark Cinderella story
 Từ Thức Gặp Tiên "Tu Thuc and the Goddess" - A mandarin meets a girl at a Buddhist temple who is really a goddess.
 "The Student and the Painting" - a girl in a painting
 Ba Giai and Tú Xuất are a comical duo in South  folk tales
Cây Tre Trăm Đốt "The Hundred-Knot Bamboo Tree" - a laborer struggles to triumph above his exploitative employer

References